An energy management system (EMS) is a system of computer-aided tools used by operators of electric utility grids to monitor, control, and optimize the performance of the generation or transmission system. Also, it can be used in small scale systems like microgrids. As electric vehicle (EV) charging becomes more popular smaller residential devices that manage when a EV can charge based on the total load vs total capacity of an electrical service are becoming popular.

Terminology
The computer technology is also referred to as SCADA/EMS or EMS/SCADA. In these respects, the terminology EMS then excludes the monitoring and control functions, but more specifically refers to the collective suite of power network applications and to the generation control and scheduling applications.

Manufacturers of EMS also commonly supply a corresponding dispatcher training simulator (DTS). This related technology makes use of components of SCADA and EMS as a training tool for control center operators.

Operating systems
Up to the early 1990s it was common to find EMS systems being delivered based on proprietary hardware and operating systems. Back then EMS suppliers such as Harris Controls (now GE), Hitachi, Cebyc, Control Data Corporation, Siemens and Toshiba manufactured their own proprietary hardware. EMS suppliers that did not manufacture their own hardware often relied on products developed by Digital Equipment, Gould Electronics and MODCOMP. The VAX 11/780 from Digital Equipment was a popular choice amongst some EMS suppliers. EMS systems now rely on a model based approach. Traditional planning models and EMS models were always independently maintained and seldom in synchronism with each other. Using EMS software allows planners and operators to share a common model reducing the mismatch between the two and cutting model maintenance by half. Having a common user interface also allows for easier transition of information from planning to operations.

As proprietary systems became uneconomical, EMS suppliers began to deliver solutions based on industry standard hardware platforms such as those from Digital Equipment (later Compaq (later HP)), IBM and Sun. The common operating system then was either DEC OpenVMS or Unix. By 2004, various EMS suppliers including Alstom, ABB and OSI had begun to offer Windows based solutions. By 2006 customers had a choice of UNIX, Linux or Windows-based systems. Some suppliers including ETAP, NARI, PSI-CNI and Siemens continue to offer UNIX-based solutions. It is now common for suppliers to integrate UNIX-based solutions on either the Sun Solaris or IBM platform. Newer EMS systems based on blade servers occupy a fraction of the space previously required. For instance, a blade rack of 20 servers occupy much the same space as that previously occupied by a single MicroVAX server.

Other meanings

Energy efficiency 
In a slightly different context, EMS can also refer to a system designed to achieve energy efficiency through process optimization by reporting on granular energy use by individual pieces of equipment. Newer, cloud-based energy management systems provide the ability to remotely control HVAC and other energy-consuming equipment; gather detailed, real-time data for each piece of equipment; and generate intelligent, specific, real-time guidance on finding and capturing the most compelling savings opportunities.

Home energy management system 
Home energy management (HEM) enables domestic consumers to take part in demand side activities. But, it confronts some problems resulted from the uncertainties of renewable energy resources and consumers' behaviour; while, the domestic consumers aim at the highest level of comfort that should be considered by minimizing the “response fatigue” phenomenon.

Automated control in buildings

The term Energy Management System can also refer to a computer system which is designed specifically for the automated control and monitoring of those electromechanical facilities in a building which yield significant energy consumption such as heating, ventilation and lighting installations. The scope may span from a single building to a group of buildings such as university campuses, office buildings, retail stores networks or factories. Most of these energy management systems also provide facilities for the reading of electricity, gas and water meters. The data obtained from these can then be used to perform self-diagnostic and optimization routines on a frequent basis and to produce trend analysis and annual consumption forecasts.
Energy management systems are also often commonly used by individual commercial entities to monitor, measure, and control their electrical building loads. Energy management systems can be used to centrally control devices like HVAC units and lighting systems across multiple locations, such as retail, grocery and restaurant sites. Energy management systems can also provide metering, submetering, and monitoring functions that allow facility and building managers to gather data and insight that allows them to make more informed decisions about energy activities across their sites.
The global energy management system market is projected to grow exponentially over the next 10-15 years.

See also
 Energy accounting
 Energy conservation measure
 Energy management
 Energy management software, software to monitor and optimize energy consumption in buildings or communities
 Energy storage as a service (ESaaS)
 Load management for balancing the supply of electricity on a distribution network.

References

Further reading
 EPRI (2005) Advanced Control Room Energy Management System: Requirements and Implementation Guidance. Palo Alto, CA. EPRI report 1010076.
 EEMUA 191 Alarm Systems – A Guide to Design, Management and Procurement (1999) 
 PAS – The Energy Management Handbook – Second Edition (2010) 
 SSM InfoTech Solutions Pvt. Ltd. – The Alarm Management Company Energy Management System
 ASM Consortium (2009) – Effective Alarm Management Practices 
 ANSI/ISA–18.2–2009 – Management of Energy Systems for the Process Industries
 IEC 62682 Management of Energy systems for the process industries

Electric power transmission systems
Management systems
Management cybernetics